A hairpin clip, also known as a retaining pin, is a type of formed wire used on a grooved shaft. It is designed to be easily installed and uninstalled, and is reusable. They are commonly made from 1050 carbon steel and 300 series stainless steel.

References

Fasteners
Steel objects